The Legend of the Holy Drinker is a 1939 novella by Austrian writer Joseph Roth, published posthumously by Allert de Lange Verlag in Amsterdam. It tells the story of a homeless alcoholic, Andreas, who wants to return money he has borrowed, but fails because he spends all of his money on alcohol.

Reception
In a 1992 review for Publishers Weekly, the critic wrote that "the author transforms his personal tragedy into a light, sparkling modern fable", and that Michael Hofmann's "inspired translation showcases Roth's galvanizing, constantly surprising style."

Adaptations
 directed a 1963 adaptation for German television. In 1988 a film adaptation with the book's title by Ermanno Olmi premiered at the Venice Film Festival, where it went on to win the top prize, the Golden Lion for best film. Olmi's version starred Rutger Hauer as Andreas.

In 2016 Winchester-based theatre company Platform 4 a created a touring production using a puppet to tell Andreas' story.

See also
 1939 in literature
 Austrian literature

References

1939 German-language novels
Austrian novels
Austrian novels adapted into films
Novels by Joseph Roth